The 2004 Chilean telethon was the 19th Teletón solidarity campaign held in Chile, on 3–4 December 2004.

News

A strong group
One of the many successes of the telethon was the large participation of a group of 15 well-known figures in Chile (led by former captain of the Chile national football team Iván Zamorano), who spent most of a day receiving donation phone calls from branches of Banco de Chile and from around the world, and during that period were very lively, singing, jumping, and encouraging all Chileans to join in.

Computing

Sponsors

Artists

National singers 
  Pablo Herrera
  Alberto Plaza
   María Jimena Pereyra
  Leandro Martínez
  Monserrat Bustamante
  Karen Paola
  Eure-K
  Douglas
  Daniela Castillo
  Los Hermanos Bustos
  Javiera Parra
  Gloria Simonetti
  Fernando Ubiergo
  José Alfredo Fuentes
  Azul Caribe
  Rigeo
  Viking 5
  La Cubanacan
  Kudai
  María José Quintanilla
  Tiro de Gracia
  Congreso

Foreign singers 
  Diego Torres
  Carlos Vives
  Obie Bermúdez
  Ismael Serrano
  Bacilos
  Juanes
  Los Tigres del Norte

Comedians 
 Álvaro Salas
 Salomón y Tutu Tutu
 Sketch of actors

Magazine 
 Clan Rojo
 Team Mekano
 Mauricio Israel sang "Si no te hubieras ido" (Eng: If you had not gone)
 Shrek and Iván Zamorano-Maria Alberó's Musicals.
 Rodrigo Díaz's Ciclo-dance.

Children's section 
 Cachureos
 Zoolo TV
 Christell

Adult's section 
 Silvina Luna
 Álvaro Ballero
 Bond Girls of Passapoga
 Pablo Vargas
 Soledad Pérez
 Lola Melnyck

Transmission 
 Red Televisión
 UCV Televisión
 Televisión Nacional de Chile
 Mega
 Chilevisión
 Canal 13
 Canal Regional

References

External links 
 Obie Bermúdez en Teletón 2004
 Juanes en Teletón 2004
 Bacilos en Teletón 2004
 Resumen Teletón 2004

Telethon
Chilean telethons